The 2002 Hassanal Bolkiah Trophy is the first edition of the invitational tournament hosted by Brunei. The tournament take place in Brunei from 16 to 26 August 2002. Ten teams from the ASEAN Football Federation participate in the tournament for under the age of 22.

Indonesia emerged as the champion after beating Thailand by 2–0 in the final, while both Myanmar and Malaysia shared the third place.

Venues

Squads

Group stage 
 All times are Brunei Darussalam Time (BNT) – UTC+8.

Tie-breaking criteria 
The teams are ranked according to points (3 points for a win, 1 point for a tie, 0 points for a loss) and tie breakers are in following order:
 Greater number of points obtained in the group matches between the teams concerned;
 Goal difference resulting from the group matches between the teams concerned;
 Greater number of goals scored in the group matches between the teams concerned;
 Result of direct matches;
 Drawing of lots.

Group A

Group B

Knockout stage

Semi-finals

Final

Team statistics 
As per statistical convention in football, matches decided in extra time are counted as wins and losses, while matches decided by penalty shoot-outs are counted as draws.

Notes

References

External links 
 RSSSF.com
 2002 Results

2002 in Asian football
2002
2002 in Brunei football
2002 in Burmese football
2002 in Malaysian football
2002 in Philippine football
2002 in Cambodian football
2002 in Laotian football
2002 in Vietnamese football
2002–03 in Indonesian football
2002 in Singaporean football
2002 in Thai football